The list of shipwrecks in June 1889 includes ships sunk, foundered, grounded, or otherwise lost during June 1889.

1 June

5 June

6 June

7 June

8 June

9 June

11 June

13 June

14 June

15 June

18 June

20 June

22 June

24 June

25 June

28 June

29 June

30 June

Unknown date

References

1889-06
Maritime incidents in June 1889